Rafael Moreno Rojas (14 August 1936 – 30 June 2021) was a Chilean politician who served as a Senator.

References

1936 births
2021 deaths
Chilean agronomists
Members of the Senate of Chile
National Falange politicians
Christian Democratic Party (Chile) politicians
People from Santiago